Nguyễn Văn Cừ (9 July 1912 – 28 August 1941) was a Vietnamese revolutionary, a descendant of Nguyễn Trãi. He served as the fourth General Secretary of the Central Committee of the Communist Party of Vietnam (CPV) 30 March 1938 – 9 November 1940.

Nguyễn Văn Cừ was arrested by the French and executed by French firing squad at the Giồng T-road junction (ngã ba Giồng) in Hóc Môn District along with Nguyễn Thị Minh Khai and Võ Văn Tần in August 1941.

References

1912 births
1941 deaths
General Secretaries of the Central Committee of the Communist Party of Vietnam
Members of the 1st Central Committee of the Indochinese Communist Party
People from Bắc Ninh province